San Pablo is a dormant volcano located in the Antofagasta Region of Chile, near the Bolivia border. It is joined to the younger San Pedro volcano by a high col. It is located in the Chilean province of El Loa, city of Calama and Ollagüe.

San Pablo was active in pre-glacial times. After that period, glaciations formed a girdle of moraines and the mountain was covered by ash fall from neighbouring San Pedro. Its central crater was eroded and a glacier formed inside. The volcano itself is formed by three groups of andesite lavas which variously contain pyroxene or hornblende; these groups are known as the Lower Group, the Middle Group and the Summit Group.

First Ascent 
San Pablo was first climbed by Hans Berger (Germany) in September 1910.

Elevation 
It has an official height of 6050 meters. Other data from available digital elevation models: SRTM yields 6098 metres, ASTER 6076 metres and TanDEM-X 6143 metres. The height of the nearest key col is 5302 meters, leading to a topographic prominence of 808 meters. San Pablo is considered a Mountain Subgroup according to the Dominance System  and its dominance is 13.22%. Its parent peak is San Pedro and the Topographic isolation is 5.1 kilometers.

External links 

 Elevation information about San Pablo
 Weather Forecast at San Pablo

References

Mountains of Chile
Stratovolcanoes of Chile
Volcanoes of Antofagasta Region
Six-thousanders of the Andes